Myung Se-bin (born April 10, 1975) is a South Korean actress from the Seochok Myeong clan. A textile graduate from Dongduk Women's University, Myung was spotted in 1996 at a department store in Seoul by singer Shin Seung-hun, who cast her in his music video. She later modeled for magazines and commercials, which led to an acting career. Myung is best known for her television dramas Purity, Paper Crane, Into the Sun and Three Sisters.

Personal life
Myung married lawyer Gang Ho-sung at the Sheraton Walkerhill Hotel on August 17, 2007. The couple divorced five months later in January 2008.

Filmography

Television series 
Doctor Cha (2023) – Choi Seung-hee 
Bossam : Steal the Fate (MBN, 2021) – Lady Haeindang of the Gwangju Yi clan, Yi I-cheom's sister and Dae-yeob's aunt
Avengers Social Club (tvN, 2017) – Lee Mi-sook
First Love Again (KBS2, 2017) – Lee Ha-jin
Kill Me, Heal Me (MBC, 2015) – Min Seo-yeon
The King's Daughter, Soo Baek-hyang (MBC, 2013) – Chae-hwa
The Sons (MBC, 2013) – Sung In-ok
Three Sisters (SBS, 2010) – Kim Eun-young
Goong S (MBC, 2007) – Queen Hwa-in
What's Up Fox (MBC, 2006) – fashion show attendee (cameo)
Special of My Life (MBC, 2006) – Yoon Se-ra
Wedding (KBS2, 2005) – Shin Yoon-soo
Span Drama episode 15: "Midnight Tea Party" (MBC, 2005) – cafe manager
The Woman Who Wants to Marry (MBC, 2004) – Lee Shin-young
Into the Sun (SBS, 2003) – Jeon Hye-rin
Who's My Love (KBS2, 2002) – Kim Go-eun
I Still Love You (SBS, 2001) – Oh Soon-mi
Some Like It Hot (MBC, 2000) – Hyun Mi-rae
She's the One (KBS2, 2000) – Jung Kyung-ran
Ghost (SBS, 1999) – Seo Jae-young
House Above the Waves (SBS, 1999) – Maria
Paper Crane (KBS2, 1998) – Choi Na-hyun
Purity (KBS2, 1998) – Yoon Hye-jin

Film 
 The Hotel (TBA)  as Lee Jung-eun 
 A Great Chinese Restaurant (1999) – Han Mi-rae
 Scent of a Man (1998) – Shin Eun-hye

Music video 
 Kim Bum-soo - "Promise" (1999)
 Lee Ji-hoon - "Alone" (1997)
 Shin Seung-hun - "Love in My Own Way" (1996)

Awards and nominations

References

1975 births
Living people
South Korean film actresses
South Korean television actresses
Dongduk Women's University alumni
Actresses from Seoul
20th-century South Korean actresses
21st-century South Korean actresses
Yeonan Myeong clan
Seochok Myeong clan